The East Rail line is one of ten lines of the Mass Transit Railway (MTR) system in Hong Kong. It used to be one of the three lines of the Kowloon–Canton Railway (KCR) network. It was known as the KCR British Section from 1910 to 1996, and the KCR East Rail from 1996 to 2007. East Rail was the only railway line of the Kowloon-Canton Railway Corporation (KCRC) following the closure of the Sha Tau Kok Railway and before the construction of KCR West Rail (later renamed West Rail line, now part of the Tuen Ma line).

The railway line starts at Admiralty on Hong Kong Island and branches in the north at Sheung Shui to terminate at Lo Wu or Lok Ma Chau stations. Both are border crossing points into Shenzhen. All of the stations on the line except Admiralty, Exhibition Centre and Hung Hom are at-grade or elevated. The line's colour is light blue.

The same railway was used for passenger and freight services crossing the boundary to other cities, including Guangzhou, Shanghai and Beijing. These longer distance passenger services (dubbed "Through Trains") start at Hung Hom and end at their termini in the mainland. The line is generally double tracked and electrified, except for certain goods sheds. Immigration and customs facilities are available at Hung Hom (for Through Train passengers) and Lo Wu/Lok Ma Chau (for border interchange passengers) stations. The MTRC announced the cease of freight services in 2009. Through Train services were suspended in early 2020 amidst the coronavirus pandemic with no plans to resume service despite border reopening's.

The railway line was operated by KCRC prior to the MTR–KCR merger and was taken over by MTR Corporation (MTRC) on 2 December 2007. KCRC continues to own the line and its infrastructure while leasing its operations to MTRC.

A southern extension which takes the line under Victoria Harbour to a new terminus,
Admiralty station, on Hong Kong Island, opened on 15 May 2022. The extension is the centrepiece of the Sha Tin to Central Link expansion project.

History

Background

Proposal
The United Kingdom and China signed an agreement to cooperate on the construction of a railway from Kowloon to Canton (now Guangzhou). However, the English could earn 65% of the income while China could only earn 35% of it. Construction started in 1906. The most difficult section was the approx. 7200-foot-long (2195 m) Beacon Hill Tunnel, and about a hundred workers died in the construction.

Construction
The construction was mainly carried out by the Chinese. The government built camps in Kowloon to support the construction. Most of the railway alignment was on flat land, so construction was relatively easy in those places, however, the construction of the Beacon Hill Tunnel involved digging and blasting. The tunnel's two ends were of soft soil, but the centre was granite. This caused a delay in construction as it was not suitable to use explosives at the two ends while the explosives could not blast off a lot of rock in the centre.

Pre-electrification era

Opening of British section
The railway line to the Chinese border, then called the Kowloon-Canton Railway (British Section), opened for passenger services on 1 October 1910. The remaining section from Lo Wu to Canton (now Guangzhou) was called the "Chinese Section" (now the Guangzhou-Shenzhen railway). Initially, service was only provided from Yau Ma Ti station to Fanling station with a tunnel through Beacon Hill.

Opening of Chinese section
After the "Chinese Section" was completed, through train service became available to Canton, through Sham Chun (now Shenzhen). Lo Wu station also serves as a border crossing, with a bridge across the Sham Chun River, the natural border between Hong Kong and Mainland China. Trains had to stop at Lo Wu station after Communist China closed the border and suspended the through train service in 1949.

The line was generally single track, with a passing loop at each station.

Closing of Sha Tau Kok Branch
The line was originally built with narrow gauge tracks, but just before opening standard gauge track was laid and the original tracks were used to build a branch line, the Sha Tau Kok Railway from Fanling to Sha Tau Kok. This branch was unsuccessful and closed on 1 April 1928 following the opening of a road that ran parallel to the tracks.

Post-1930s
Through the years, more stations were added to the line. Sheung Shui station was opened in the 1930s, and Ma Liu Shui (now University) station opened in 1955.

The KCR engines were powered by steam engines before the 1950s. There were 20 engines. However, diesel engines were purchased starting from 1950, with the first one with number 51. Steam engines then disappeared from KCR.

Change of terminus
The development of the towns along the line began to grow immensely during the 1970s, prompting a modernisation of the Kowloon-Canton Railway. The original Kowloon station terminus at Tsim Sha Tsui was too small and had no room for expansion, so a new terminus site was chosen in Hung Hom, then known as Kowloon station. The new Kowloon station replaced the old one in 1975. Today, a clock tower is the only structure left from the old terminus, and is a landmark near the Cultural Centre, Space Museum and the Star Ferry pier. Six pillars were relocated to the Urban Council Centenary Garden in Tsim Sha Tsui East. A big bell is stored at Ho Tung Lau. The original Hung Hom station at Chatham Road South was also demolished.

1980s modernisation

In 1975, the KCR asked two consultancies, Sofrerail and Transmark, to make proposals on the modernisation of the line. In 1979, Transmark's proposal to double-track and electrify the entire line for $2.5 billion (in 1979 prices) was accepted by the government. This work involved building a new tunnel through Beacon Hill as the existing tunnel was not wide enough to accommodate two tracks. New stations were added, including Kowloon Tong station, which was completed in 1982 to provide an interchange with the new MTR network. Tai Po Kau station and the original Tai Po Market station were closed, with the latter being redeveloped into the Hong Kong Railway Museum. The development finished in sections between 1982 and 1983, with new Metro Cammell EMUs, manufactured by Metro-Cammell in England, replacing diesel locomotives.

With the modernisation of the railway and the concurrent urbanisation of the New Territories, ridership rose quickly, from a daily average of 190,000 in 1983 to 491,000 in 1990. A temporary station in Tai Wai opened in 1983 while the permanent Tai Wai station was completed in 1986. Fo Tan station opened in 1985 to serve the expanding industrial estate. Tai Wo station opened in 1989 to serve Tai Wo Estate.

The 1990s saw more rapid development and changes within the railway. The Kowloon-Canton Railway Corporation (KCRC) signed a contract with Anglo-French manufacturing giant GEC-Alsthom to refurbish the Metro-Cammell EMUs at the East Rail depot at Ho Tung Lau. In 1996, the first refurbished train was put into service, and trains now allow passengers to traverse from one end to another (except for the first class carriage), when trains once ran on four three-car EMUs. All but three of the 351 railcars were refurbished; the only unit exempt from refurbishment was unit E44 (144-244-444), which is currently stored in Ho Tung Lau depot. Each set is still made up of 12 cars (with one first-class car). Prior to the rule proclaimed in 1994 which fixed the number of cars on each set to 12, trains were inconsistent in terms of length, ranging from six cars (two EMUs), nine cars (three EMUs) to 12 cars (four EMUs).

In terms of appearance, trains no longer have the monotonous design of having a red stripe running across the middle from the cab to the end; the doors now have a red coating, and the window panes along with the upper part are fashioned with blue paint. The original design of the train front, encapsulating the driver's cab and commonly referred to as the "Yellow-cab", was replaced with a more modern design capped with a silver coating, and a digital display added providing the train's destination.

The design of the EMU was modified as well: four more sets of doors being added to each car, adding up to a total of ten sets of doors, each side with five; the introduction of new passenger information plasma display; and more standing space by rearranging seating patterns from the traditional back-to-back seating to a longitudinal design. The yellow-cab train was formally retired with a "Farewell Ride" on 31 October 1999.

In 1998, a new signalling system, known as Transmission balise-locomotive (TBL, as used in Belgium), came into operation on the line. This Automatic Train Protection (ATP) system, a replacement for the previous Automatic Warning System (AWS) developed in Britain, ensures a safe distance is maintained between trains. It also allowed an increase in train frequencies from 20 to 24 per hour each way. The control centre was also relocated from Kowloon station to a new facility in the KCRC operations headquarters building at Fo Tan Railway House. Also as part of the ATP project, a two kilometre section of the tracks near the Pak Shek Kok reclamation, curving around the former coastline, was straightened out during the mid-1990s. The tracks now run alongside the Tolo Highway. A vestige of the former alignment, an old bridge beside Cheung Shue Tan village built between 1906 and 1909, was identified by the Antiquities and Monuments Office in 2008 as a historic asset.

In 2002, an automatic train operation (ATO) system was added to TBL, which controls the speed of the train for the driver and ensures that all trains will stop when arriving at every station. Under normal circumstances, most trains are operated in ATO mode except for scenarios such as operation of trains in and out of train depots, driver training, or at times when the ATO system fails to function properly. However, intercity trains using the East Rail line continue to operate on AWS.

Recent developments

 In 2004, the railway was extended in tunnel to a new southern terminus at East Tsim Sha Tsui station.
 On 28 December 2004, a branch to the East Rail, the Ma On Shan Rail was added, with an interchange at Tai Wai.
 On 15 August 2007, an extension from Sheung Shui station northwest through a tunnel to Lok Ma Chau station was opened. This provides a second border crossing between Hong Kong SAR and Mainland China.
 On 16 August 2009, Hung Hom became the southern terminus of both East Rail line and West Rail line after the completion of the Kowloon Southern Link. East Tsim Sha Tsui became an intermediate station on West Rail line (now part of Tuen Ma line).
 On 15 May 2022, an extension from Hung Hom southward across Victoria Harbour to a new southern terminus at Admiralty station was opened as part of phase two of the Sha Tin to Central Link (SCL). An intermediate station was opened at Exhibition Centre.

Tunnels
Tunnels on the East Rail line have numbers assigned to them. When the railway was first opened, there were five tunnels:
 North of today's Mong Kok East station
 Beacon Hill Tunnel
 South of where University station stands today
 North of university station
 At Tai Po Kau

During the construction of the Cross-Harbour Tunnel, which opened in 1972, the section of tracks near Oi Man Estate, Ho Man Tin was covered to construct the section of Princess Margaret Road connecting to the Cross-Harbour Tunnel. A new tunnel was therefore created and given the number 1A.

During the modernisation of the line in the early 1980s, Tunnels 1, 3, 4 were removed by demolishing the mounds above them. Tunnel 1A already had double track width when built; a completely new Beacon Hill Tunnel (Tunnel 2) was constructed and took over the original one; and Tunnel 5 was doubled. The new one is known as Tunnel 5A.

Rolling stock

The line is currently served solely by nine-car R-Stock trains, which entered service on 6 February 2021.

Before the introduction of the new R-stock trains, the East Rail line was operated with two types of commuter trains: the 29 refurbished Metro-Cammell EMUs and eight sets of the newer SP1900 EMUs, manufactured by Kinki Sharyo of Japan in 2001. Both models shared the same exterior colour scheme, door arrangement (five pairs per car, except first class), as well as consisting of 12 carriages per train including a first class section. The interior design between the two models is different, and the transverse seating near the ends of the Metro-Cammell carriages has been replaced with longitudinal seating in the Kinki Sharyo models to allow for a wider gangway between compartments. All of the East Rail line Hyundai-Rotem trains are maintained at Ho Tung Lau Depot in Sha Tin.

With the construction of the Sha Tin to Central Link, which cannot accommodate trains of greater than nine cars, the MTR decided in December 2012 to phase out all of the aging Metro-Cammell trains from 2020 and replace them with 37 sets of 9-car R-Stock trains built by Hyundai Rotem of South Korea. In 2020, the MTR purchased an additional 6 trains bringing the total number to 43 sets. The first new train arrived in Hong Kong in September 2015 and entered service in February 2021. They fully replaced the older fleet in time for the opening of the Hung Hom to Admiralty section of the Sha Tin to Central Link on May 15, 2022. Due to the shorter train length, there are concerns that the new formation may worsen the existing overcrowding problem. However, the Transport and Housing Bureau and MTRC suggest that the new signaling system and higher train speeds will increase the train frequency from three minutes down to two minutes. It is also estimated that with the completion of the Sha Tin to Central Link (Tai Wai – Hung Hom section), 20% of the current East Rail line passengers will take the new East West Corridor.

The SP1900 EMUs were withdrawn from the East Rail line on 6 February 2021 and, together with the SP1900/1950 sets on the West Rail and Ma On Shan lines, are being reconfigured as 8-car trains to serve the Tuen Ma line. The conversion project is taking place at MTR's Pat Heung Depot and converted sets are being placed into service on the Tuen Ma line alongside newly delivered CRRC Changchun TML C-trains (nicknamed as the Fake SP1900 due to its similarity to the SP1900). The SP1900 first class cars will be shipped back to Kinki Sharyo factory in Osaka, Japan for conversion into standard-class compartments. The Metro-Cammell EMUs were retired on 6 May 2022, with the last train leaving Hung Hom at 13:00, departing for Sha Tin, and ending service there to a large crowd who took the train, with the crowd giving a big thank-you for the train, as it served Hong Kong for 40 years.

First class

The East Rail line is the only railway in Hong Kong to offer first class commuter service. One car of each train is furbished as a first class carriage (Northbound Car No.4 and Southbound Car No.6). These compartments have softer and wider seat arrangements; however, standing in the first class car is common during rush hour.

Riding on this carriage costs twice that of a standard-class journey and passengers are required to buy the first class ticket (at the vending machine on East Rail line stations or ticket counters at the other stations) or revalidate their Octopus cards on the first class reader (located at the station platforms and beside the gangway door of the First class compartment itself) before entering the first-class car. Ticket Inspectors will perform random checks on train, and failing to produce a valid first class ticket or validated Octopus Card will be liable to a surcharge of $500.

Safety
The East Rail line is Hong Kong's oldest heavy railway (as opposed to the tramways). While generally regarded as very safe, the railway suffered some serious incidents during its history.

Train accidents
At about 11:00 on 14 June 1923, a train derailed at Ma Liu Shui due to a landslide following heavy rain. The locomotive and one coach derailed and slid down the embankment to the edge of Tide Cove. Nobody was injured.

The same locomotive involved in the 1923 incident was involved in a more serious derailment on 20 April 1931. Owing to heavy rains, an embankment at Ma Liu Shui south of today's University station was weakened. It collapsed as a Kowloon-bound train passed over it at about 17:10, causing the locomotive and four carriages to crash and pile atop one another. There were 12 deaths and eight serious injuries.

On 12 November 1955, a fatal accident occurred at Mile 17, the site of a private military level crossing. A speeding passenger train struck a British military "Comet" tank at the crossing. A new diesel electric locomotive, the Sir Alexander (now exhibited in the Hong Kong Railway Museum), derailed. Various other carriages were severely damaged. The train guard and a member of the tank crew were killed.

At 15:00 on 18 December 1980, a contractor building Mong Kok (now Mong Kok East) station accidentally severed signalling cables, disabling the automatic signalling system. At this time, the railway had been only partly doubled-tracked, and still made use of the old single-track Beacon Hill Tunnel. Later in the day, two trains were inadvertently put on a head-on collision course just south of the tunnel. At 18:40, a Lo Wu-bound train carrying about 1,500 passengers reached the point where the double-tracked section of the railway ended ahead of the tunnel, near Yau Yat Chuen. A safety device, a trap point, prevented the collision by forcing the train to derail, causing minor injuries to some passengers. A minute later, a southbound train came to a screeching halt at the accident site. A KCR spokesman blamed "a misunderstanding in a telephone communication".

On 25 November 1984, a train derailed between Sheung Shui and Lo Wu stations. The incident occurred when the driver, meaning to back the train up to Sheung Shui station, failed to follow a speed/stop signal while the train was exceeding the speed limit. The train was being driven from the rear cabin, with the driver relying on signals from the train guard who was in the front carriage. The train sped past a danger signal onto a siding at 30 km/h, rather than shunting onto the main line at 10 km/h as it was meant to. It crashed into a concrete buffer at the end of the siding, with the first two cars piling on top of each other. The damage was so severe that the cars never returned to service. Passengers had been unloaded prior to the crash while the two KCR employees escaped significant injury. However, the accident caused train services to be suspended for the rest of the day and the incident spurred a series of public outcries concerning railway safety. The KCR determined that the accident occurred due to human error and not any system failure, suspended the driver, and changed procedures such that drivers were required to operate the train from the front carriage while shunting at Sheung Shui.

In 1988, there were numerous separate incidents of Chinese freight trains derailing on the railway. On 28 May, a locomotive and a goods wagon jumped the tracks near Fo Tan station, blocking the line. Services were temporarily detoured through Racecourse station. On 4 June, a wagon derailed near University station, again blocking the line. Coupled with a lorry accident in the Lion Rock Tunnel the same day, Kowloon and Sha Tin were thrown into "traffic chaos". On 2 July, another goods wagon derailed on a siding in Lo Wu after arriving from Shenzhen. As it was being hauled to the Fo Tan workshop at 1:44 am the following day for examination, it derailed again, though damage to the tracks was minor. Nobody was injured in the above incidents. The problems were attributed to uneven loading of the freight trains, sharply curved trackage "unideal" for the freight wagons, and the structural characteristics of the Chinese trains. In response, KCRC carried out track improvements and liaised with the Guangzhou Railway Administration. At the time, the KCRC handled 6.25 million freight wagons per year, so the derailments were relatively isolated occurrences.

In the early morning of 31 May 1989, diesel locomotive L57 collided head-on with locomotive L56 at Mongkok (now Mong Kok East) station, causing injuries to four KCR staff. Three employees in L57 were taking the locomotive from Kowloon (now Hung Hom) station to Fo Tan for repairs. The locomotive ran a red signal and struck the stationary L56 while traveling at about 50 km/h. Chan Yau-keung, a KCR Corporation construction supervisor, was critically injured and died on 8 June at Kwong Wah Hospital. He had been standing between the driver Ko Yuk-ching and co-driver Lee Kam-ming, both of whom were seated. Ko was a qualified driver while Lee, an assistant operator, was operating under Ko's supervision. Lee was driving at the time of the accident, but was seated in the left of the cabin and could not see the signals, which were on the right and were obscured by the long hood of the vehicle. According to procedures, Lee had to rely on Ko to relay him the status of the signals. Ko, speaking at an inquest following the accident, stated that he had felt dizzy and could not recall what colours the signals displayed. The advance warning system (AWS) of locomotive L57, which would have automatically halted the train, was switched off. KCR officers in the control centre saw the impending collision but could not warn the crew as the L57 radio was switched off.

On 17 September 2019 at 08:32, East Rail service L094 carrying around 500 passengers derailed while approaching Platform 1 of Hung Hom station, injuring eight passengers, with five of whom hospitalised. Cars 4 to 6 were derailed, with cars 4 and 5 disconnected, while cars 1-3 and 7-12 remained on the track. An independent investigation by the Electrical and Mechanical Services Department revealed the cause of the derailment to be a widened track gauge due to the deterioration of the railway sleeper. Sleepers (35-36) of turnout P5116 were found to have been rotted and the screw hole deformed and enlarged. This significantly weakened the ability of the sleepers to be secured to the baseplate and thus maintain proper track gauge. In addition, under the dynamic stress load of the train running over it, the track widened excessively. Sections of the track, including check rails, were found broken and cracked. It was found that four earlier trains that entered Hung Hom station on that morning before service L094 had also suffered hit marks on their wheels. Track sections between 17 sleepers in turnout P5116 exceeded the safety limit of 1,455 mm (the designed track gauge was 1,435 mm). The investigation recommended the installation of real-time monitoring equipment to improve the surveillance of track conditions so that an improved maintenance regime could prevent similar events from occurring in the future.

Underframe cracking
On 21 December 2005, a Metro Cammell EMU failed while in operation. Following examination of the train, KCRC staff detected minor cracks in the welding of mounting brackets for some underframe components. A review panel commissioned by KCRC looked into the problem from four aspects:
 the rate of change of the acceleration and deceleration of trains
 the welding of components' mounting brackets
 the profile of the track and train wheels
 suspension system

Since the full introduction of automatic train operation (ATO) on the East Rail system in 2003, the rate of change of acceleration and deceleration resulting from ATO driving added stress to the underframe components. To allow a root cause investigation to be carried out, the use of the ATO system was suspended on 15 January 2006, leaving the operation of trains back in the hands of the train drivers, the safety of train operation under the control of the automatic train protection system. This resulted in a decreased frequency (from 24 to 23 trains per hour) and lengthened trip time (increase by 90 seconds to 42.5 minutes). KCRC also temporarily transferred some staff from West Rail to cope with recent maintenance of trains.

The Environment, Transport and Works Bureau reprimanded the KCRC for not immediately notifying the Government when it found problems with its East Rail trains in 2005. Secretary for the Bureau Dr. Sarah Liao said she had ordered the KCRC to inspect all its trains, and did not rule out suspending services if there were safety doubts. Dr. Liao ordered the chairman to review the corporation's operations, including its management and overall system, and submit a report. KCRC chairman Michael Tien accepted responsibility for the corporation's poor judgement in not sharing the information with the public in a timely matter.

On 21 January 2006, Michael Tien stated that the safety problems of East Rail had been controlled, and the train service was expected to operate as usual, including train service in the Chinese New Year. KCRC East Rail trains reverted to the ATO operation on 6 August 2006, after the investigation confirmed that the ATO system was not a direct cause of the cracking.

Platform gaps
The wide platform gap at several stations (namely Lo Wu, Tai Wo, University, Kowloon Tong, and Mong Kok East) is a safety concern. The KCRC has visually marked the "Gap Black Spots" on the platforms of those stations and stated that plates will be installed in the gap between the train and station. The platform gap is mainly caused by the curvature of the station and how the train enters the station area. A mechanical gap filler system, which extends the platform edge when a train is stopped at the station, was trialed at Lo Wu station.

After two incidents of children falling onto the tracks at University station in 1985, the issue was discussed in the Legislative Council. The Secretary for Transport asserted that the gaps were within "international safety limits", and that the gap could not be narrowed due to the curvature of the station as well as the "rather wider bodies" of the Chinese through trains which run through the station daily. A man who fractured his leg boarding a train at University station in 2008 asserted that he fell into a gap of about 35 cm, while the MTR claimed it was only 22 cm at the relevant section of platform.

The new MTR R-Stock trains have wider compartments than the older East Rail line rolling stock, therefore narrowing the gap. Also, due to the decrease in train lengths from twelve cars to nine cars, trains will stop at less curved sections of the platforms. MTR suggests that the width of the gap will be similar to that of the urban lines. In addition, automatic platform gates are being installed on East Rail line platforms as part of the Sha Tin to Central Link project. These will block passengers' view of the wide platform gaps. To reduce this safety risk, the MTR is installing 140 mechanical gap fillers at Mong Kok East, university, and Lo Wu stations.

Stations
This is a list of the stations on the East Rail line.

Notes

Lo Wu and Lok Ma Chau are within the Frontier Closed Area and, as of 2023, cannot be entered by anyone without a permit or a passport and visa to Mainland China.

In May 2008, MTR announced plans to renew many stations, some of which have been in service for over half a century. Refurbishment is not expected to be fully completed until 2016 at the earliest.

Currently, the East Rail line is the only line on the MTR network which does not have all its stations fitted with platform screen doors (PSDs) or platform edge doors. Admiralty, Exhibition, and Hung Hom are the only three stations on the line with PSDs, with Tai Po Market and Racecourse stations due to have them installed mid 2023. The remaining stations to have plans for PSDs to be installed in the future.

There are long distances between University and Tai Po Market stations, between Tai Wo and Fanling stations, and between Sheung Shui and Lok Ma Chau stations; and there are no intermediate stations within these sections. These sections of track are nearby the Science Park, Tai Po Kau, Hong Lok Yuen, Kau Lung Hang village, and Kwu Tung village. However, intermediate stations within some sections of the track are under planning.

Train service 

Trains run at around 4-8 minute intervals Mondays to Fridays from 05:00 to 01:00 the next day. However, Lo Wu and Lok Ma Chau stations close at approximately 00:30 the next day and 23:00 respectively, which means that trains terminate at Sheung Shui after both border checkpoints are closed. During peak hours, trains are more frequent, running every 2–3 minutes. Due to the pandemic, Northbound trains terminated at Sheung Shui for three years, until Lok Ma Chau crossing was reopened on January 8, 2023. Lo Wu station reopened on February 6, 2023, after completion of renovation. However, after border hours, trains will still go to the 2 stations and turn back to Sheung Shui.

Special train departures 

Some train trips may not be scheduled to depart in the usual way. For example, trains may call at Racecourse station, terminate at intermediate stations and/or enter the Ho Tung Lau Depot. These special services usually take place during morning peak hours on weekdays and Saturdays.

Examples of special train services:
 Northbound trains may terminate at Sha Tin or Tai Po Market station, which usually takes place during morning peak hours.
 Northbound trains may terminate at Sha Tin station in order to enter the Ho Tung Lau Depot.
 Northbound trains will terminate at Sheung Shui station after Lo Wu/Lok Ma Chau border crossings close.
 Trains may call at Racecourse station during racing days, omitting Fo Tan Station.
 Trains calling at Racecourse station may terminate at the following stations: Lo Wu, Lok Ma Chau, Tai Po Market, Racecourse
 Southbound trains may terminate at Hung Hom or Mong Kok East station.

References

Bibliography

External links

 Official MTR website

 
MTR lines
Regional rail in Hong Kong
Railway lines opened in 1910
1910 establishments in Hong Kong